Mary M. McPhillips is a politician from Middletown, Orange County, New York.

Political career
She entered politics as a Democrat, and was a  member of the New York State Assembly (94th D.) from 1983 to 1989, sitting in the 185th, 186th, 187th and 188th New York State Legislatures.

She was County Executive of Orange County from 1990 to 1993; and a presidential elector in 1992.

See also
ONLY MARY WILL DETERMINE IF SHOW GOES ON By Mike Levine, Published: Times Herald-Record 01/15/07
IN THE POLITICAL RING, THE NEXT BOUT COUNTS Mike Levine, Published: Times Herald-Record 01/14/07

References

Year of birth missing (living people)
Living people
Politicians from Orange County, New York
Democratic Party members of the New York State Assembly
Women state legislators in New York (state)